Frederick William Jones (January 1867 – 27 December 1910) was a Welsh international footballer who played in the Football League for Small Heath and Lincoln City.

Career
Jones was born in Llandudno, which was then in Caernarfonshire, and began his football career with Llandudno Swifts before trying his luck in England. He began with West Manchester and in the summer of 1890 moved on to Burslem Port Vale. He made his debut in a friendly at Newton Heath on 1 September 1890 and must have spoken to the opposition management as he left on a transfer to Newton Heath at his own request at the end of the month.

Without playing a competitive game for the club in nearly two years, Jones left Newton Heath for Football League Second Division club Small Heath in August 1892. His brother Arnold also played for the club during the 1892–93 season, though never appeared for the first team. After Fred Speller broke his leg, Jones took over the left back position, making his debut on 3 December 1892 in a 1–1 draw at home to Sheffield United, and played nine games in all competitions, contributing to Small Heath's Second Division title.

On 18 March 1893 Jones won his first and only full international cap for Wales, and became the first Small Heath player to be capped by Wales; Wales lost 8–0 to Scotland.

By then, Jones had lost his place in Small Heath's starting eleven to Bernard Pumfrey, and in September 1893 he joined fellow Second Division club Lincoln City. He played nine times in all competitions for Lincoln's first team, later joining Reading and then returning to Wales. In the latter part of his career he was employed more often as an emergency goalkeeper than a full-back.

Jones was found dead in the street in his native Llandudno; his death, in 1910 at the age of 43, was attributed to an apoplectic seizure.

Statistics
Source:

References

1867 births
1910 deaths
People from Llandudno
Sportspeople from Conwy County Borough
Welsh footballers
Wales international footballers
Association football fullbacks
Llandudno Swifts F.C. players
Port Vale F.C. players
Manchester United F.C. players
Birmingham City F.C. players
Lincoln City F.C. players
Reading F.C. players
English Football League players